Femke Gerritse (born 14 May 2001) is a Dutch professional racing cyclist, who currently rides for UCI Women's Continental Team Parkhotel Valkenburg. 

In 2019, she won the Dutch national junior women's road race. In 2021, she signed with Parkhotel Valkenburg. In 2022, she came third overall in the Thüringen Ladies Tour, winning the white jersey of best placed young rider. Later that year, Gerritse led the mountains classification at the Tour de France Femmes for four stages.

Major results

2022
 3rd Overall Thüringen Ladies Tour
1st  Young rider classification
 Tour de France 
Held  after Stages 3–6

References

External links 

 Femke Gerritse at ProCyclingStats
 Femke Gerritse at Cycling Archives

Living people
2001 births
Dutch female cyclists
People from Rosmalen
Cyclists from North Brabant
21st-century Dutch women